Ana Paula Pereira da Silva Villela (born 16 February 1997), known as Ana Paula, is a Brazilian women's association football forward, who plays for 1207 Antalya Spor in the Turkish Women's Football Super League with jersey number 9.

Private life 
Ana Paula was born in Rio de Janeiro.

Club career 
Ana Paula played for Vasco da Gama in 2016. The next two years, she was with Ponte Preta in the Campeonato Brasileiro de Futebol Feminino Série A1. She returned to her former club Vasco in 2020.

Mid October 2022, she moved to Turkey, and signed with 1207 Antalya Spor to play in the 2022–23 Women's Super League.

References 

1997 births
Living people
Footballers from Rio de Janeiro (city)
Brazilian women's footballers
Women's association football forwards
CR Vasco da Gama (women) players
Brazilian expatriate women's footballers
Expatriate women's footballers in Turkey
Brazilian expatriate sportspeople in Turkey
Turkish Women's Football Super League players
1207 Antalya Spor players